Gerald Kammerlander (born 13 August 1981) is an Austrian luger who has competed since 2000. A natural track luger, he won a complete set of medals at the FIL World Luge Natural Track Championships with a gold (Men's singles: 2011), a silver (Mixed team: 2011), and a bronze (Mixed team: 2007).

Kammerlander also won a bronze in the mixed team event at the FIL European Luge Championships 2010 in St. Sebastian, Austria.

References
FIL-Luge profile
Natural track World Championships results: 1979-2007

External links 

 

1981 births
Living people
Austrian male lugers